DXBB (1107 AM) Radyo Alerto was a radio station owned and operated by Soccsksargen Broadcasting Network. The station's studio was located along Yumang St., Brgy. San Isidro, General Santos.

Profile
The station was established by GMA Network on May 18, 1996, along with DXCJ. It went off the air in the early 2000s due to resource problems. Parts of the programming of the original Super Radyo General Santos were revived sometime in 2021 when Barangay FM 102.3 was relaunched as Barangay FM 102.3 Super Radyo.

In March 2011, DXBB was acquired by Soccsksargen Broadcasting Network, a company owned by some of Manny Pacquiao's friends, and was relaunched as Radyo Alerto. It also served as an affiliate of GMA's DZBB in Manila. It went off the air sometime in 2019.

References

Radio stations in General Santos
Radio stations established in 1996
Radio stations disestablished in 2019
News and talk radio stations in the Philippines
Defunct radio stations in the Philippines